Cwmwysg (Welsh for "Usk valley") is a small rural community southwest of Trecastle in the valley of the Usk river, Powys, Wales.

It includes the Saron Independent Chapel, originally built in 1822 and rebuilt in 1856. The humpback stone river bridge over the Usk is Grade II listed.

The Welsh painter Aneurin Jones (1930–2017) was born in Cwmwysg.

References

Communities in Powys